Dianthoveus is a genus of plants first described as a genus in 1989. It contains only one known species, Dianthoveus cremnophilus , native to Colombia and Ecuador in South America.

References

Cyclanthaceae
Monotypic Pandanales genera
Flora of South America